List of country subdivisions by GDP may refer to:

 List of country subdivisions by GDP over 200 billion US dollars
 List of first-level administrative country subdivisions by nominal GDP per capita

See also 
 List of cities by GDP
 List of countries and dependencies by area
 List of country second-level subdivisions by area
 List of country third-level subdivisions by area
 List of political and geographic subdivisions by total area
 List of the largest country subdivisions by area
 Lists of countries by GDP

Lists by economic indicators